Rafael Ángel Rondón Márquez, better known as R.A. Rondón Márquez (Zea, Venezuela, 1898 - Caracas, 1966), was a Venezuelan writer and historian, author of Guzmán Blanco, el autócrata civilizador (Municipal Prize of Literature, 1945).

References 
R.A. Rondón Márquez at sololiteratura.com

1898 births
1966 deaths
People from Mérida (state)
20th-century Venezuelan historians
Venezuelan male writers
20th-century male writers